After the 2001 Danish parliamentary election, Anders Fogh Rasmussen was able form a government coalition of his own Liberal Party Venstre and the Conservative People's Party. It was a minority government with the parliamentary support of the Danish People's Party. The resulting cabinet is called the Cabinet of Anders Fogh Rasmussen I. Apart from the EU Presidency in 2002 during which the enlargement of the European Union was decided, the main issues for the cabinet were the so-called tax freeze, which ended the upward drift in municipal income tax rates, tax cuts, law and order, limiting the number of refugees and immigrants coming to Denmark as well as the war in Afghanistan and Iraq.

In the 2005 Danish parliamentary election, Anders Fogh Rasmussen retained his parliamentary support, and was able to reform his cabinet as the Cabinet of Anders Fogh Rasmussen II, with a few changes from the Cabinet of Anders Fogh Rasmussen I.

Cabinet changes
On 18 June 2002 Flemming Hansen replaced Bendt Bendtsen as Minister of Nordic Cooperation.

In April 2004 Svend Aage Jensby resigned and was replaced by Søren Gade.

On 2 August 2004 there was a cabinet change:
Henriette Kjær was appointed to the new post of Minister of Family and Consumption.
Bertel Haarder was appointed to the new post of Minister for Development Cooperation.
Kristian Jensen replaced Svend Erik Hovmand as Tax Minister.
Hans Christian Schmidt replaced Mariann Fischer Boel as Minister of Food. Mariann Fischer Boel became a member of the European Commission.
Eva Kjer Hansen replaced Henriette Kjær as Social Minister and Minister for Women's Rights.
Connie Hedegaard replaced Hans Christian Schmidt as Minister for the Environment.

List of ministers and portfolios
Some periods in the table below end after 18 February 2005 because the minister also serves in Anders Fogh Rasmussens second cabinet.

References
 Regeringen Anders Fogh Rasmussen I – from the official website of the Folketing

2001 establishments in Denmark
2005 disestablishments in Denmark
Rasmussen, Anders Fogh 1
Anders Fogh Rasmussen
Cabinets established in 2001
Cabinets disestablished in 2005